The Church of Saints Joseph and Mary or Sawyer Log Church was built in 1884 by Ojibwe parishioners in Sawyer, Minnesota, United States.  It is one of the state's oldest Catholic churches built among the Ojibwe people, one of the oldest churches in northern Minnesota overall, and one of Carlton County's few historic buildings to predate the 1918 Cloquet Fire.

References

Buildings and structures in Carlton County, Minnesota
Former Roman Catholic church buildings in Minnesota
Native American history of Minnesota
Ojibwe culture
Churches on the National Register of Historic Places in Minnesota
National Register of Historic Places in Carlton County, Minnesota
Roman Catholic churches completed in 1884
1884 establishments in Minnesota
Log buildings and structures on the National Register of Historic Places in Minnesota
Native American Christianity
Fond du Lac Band of Lake Superior Chippewa